The seventh season of The Voice began airing on 15 April 2018, although it was originally scheduled to debut on 16 April 2018. The coaching line-up consisted of returning coaches Delta Goodrem, returning for her sixth season, Boy George and Kelly Rowland, both returning for their second, and new addition Joe Jonas, replacing Seal.

Sam Perry from Team Kelly won the competition on 17 June 2018, marking Rowland's first win as a coach.

Coaches and hosts

On 11 October 2017, the series was renewed for a seventh season and it was announced that Goodrem, George and Rowland would all return. On 14 December 2017, Nine announced Joe Jonas would replace Seal as the fourth judge for the seventh season.

Teams
Color key

Blind auditions 

Colour key

Episode 1 (15 April) 
The coaches performed a cover of "Heroes" together at the end of the show.

Episode 2 (16 April)

Episode 3 (17 April)

Episode 4 (22 April)

Episode 5 (23 April)

Episode 6 (24 April)

Episode 7 (25 April)

Episode 8 (29 April)

Episode 9 (30 April)

Episode 10 (1 May)

The Knockouts 

The first episode of the knockouts aired on 6 May 2018. Each knockout round pits 3 artists from the same team against each other, with only one act winning each round. The judges also get two 'steals' each for the entirety of the knockouts, which allows them to steal a rejected act from another team.

Color key

Episode 11 (6 May)

Episode 12 (7 May)

Joe wanted to steal Somer as well, but it was edited as if Joe's team was already full and Somer joined Team Delta on default.

Episode 13 (8 May)

Battle rounds 
The first episode of the Battle Rounds was first broadcast on 13 May 2018.

Color key

Episode 14 (13 May)

Episode 15 (14 May)

The Live Shows

Episode 16 (20 May)

The first episode of the Live shows was first broadcast on 20 May 2018.

Episode 17 (27 May)

Episode 18 (3 June)

The Semi-Finals
The semi-finals will first broadcast on 10 June 2018. At the end of this episode, four artists will advance to the grand final, while the other five will be eliminated.

With the eliminations of Trent Bell and Ben Clark, Delta Goodrem had no more contestants left on her team, making this the third season in the Australian version of the franchise where a coach didn't have a contestant in the grand finale. This was also the second season in which Goodrem did not have an act in the grand finale.

Sheldon Riley was originally given Girls Just Want to Have Fun but the song didn't work for him so Boy George changed it to Rise.

Grand Finale
The Grand Finale will first broadcast on 17 June 2018.

 With Sam Perry and Bella Paige being the Winner and Runner-up, respectively, Kelly Rowland became the second coach in the Australian version of the franchise to have two of her artists as the Top 2, the first being Delta Goodrem in the fifth season.  Only female coaches have had this distinction.

Live Shows Elimination Chart

Overall
Artist's info

Result details

Team
Result details

Contestants who appeared on previous shows or seasons
Aydan Calafiore originally auditioned for season 6, but no coach turned their chair during his audition. He was previously a cast member of the 2012 reboot of Network Ten's Young Talent Time. He also auditioned on Australia's Got Talent in 2013.
Sally Skelton originally auditioned for season 6, where she was eliminated during the battles.
Bella Paige was in the Top 3 of season 1 of The Voice Kids Australia. She also represented Australia at Junior Eurovision Song Contest 2015.
Brock Ashby was part of Moorhouse, a boy band which came fourth on the first season of The X Factor New Zealand.
Nathan Brake was on the seventh season of Australian Idol where he came fourth.
Jacinta Gulisano was on the fifth season of The X Factor Australia, as a member of the band THIRD D3GREE, that finished in fourth place.
Tajana Turkovic was on the second season of The Voice Croatia (Najljepši glas Hrvatske) where she was eliminated during the battle rounds.
Chrislyn Hamilton was on the sixth season of Australian Idol where she came fifth.
Emma Fitzgerald originally auditioned for season 6, but no coach turned their chair during her audition.
Michelle Cashman originally auditioned for season 2, but no coach turned their chair during her audition. She also appeared on the first season of Australian Idol where she was a semi-finalist.
Trent Bell was on the fourth season of The X Factor, as a member of The Collective, where they came third. He also auditioned for the seventh season of Australian Idol.
Gemma Nha competed on season 1 of The Voice Kids Australia and reached top 15.
Maddison McNamara originally auditioned for season 5, where she was eliminated during the super battles.
Sheldon Riley was on the eight season of The X Factor, as a member of Time and Place, who were eliminated on the first live show.

Ratings
 Colour key:
  – Highest rating during the season
  – Lowest rating during the season

References

7
2018 Australian television seasons